Goraghan-e Tangan (also Romanized as Gorāghān-e Tangān) is a village in Saghder Rural District, Jebalbarez District, Jiroft County, Kerman Province, Iran. At the 2006 census, its population was 74, in 22 families.

References 

Populated places in Jiroft County